Sơn Thành is a commune (xã) and village in Na Rì District, Bắc Kạn Province, in Vietnam.

Populated places in Bắc Kạn province
Communes of Bắc Kạn province